Jan Mazur (June 5, 1920 in Płoskie – September 26, 2008 in Siedlce) was the Polish bishop of the Roman Catholic Diocese of Siedlce from August 6, 1968 until his retirement on March 25, 1996. He remained the Bishop Emeritus of Siedlce until his death in 2008 at the age of 88.

See also

External links 
 Catholic Hierarchy: Bishop Jan Mazur

1920 births
2008 deaths
People from Zamość County
20th-century Roman Catholic bishops in Poland